Selenisa is a genus of moths in the family Erebidae.

Species

 Selenisa affulgens (Saalmüller 1881)
 Selenisa humeralis (Walker 1858)
 Selenisa lanipes (Guenée 1852)
 Selenisa macarioides (Moschler 1880)
 Selenisa monogonia (Hampson 1926)
 Selenisa portoricensis (Moschler 1890)
 Selenisa projiciens (Hampson 1926)
 Selenisa specifica (Moschler 1880)
 Selenisa stipata (Walker 1865)
 Selenisa suero (Cramer 1777); 
 Selenisa sueroides (Guenée 1852) – pale-edged selenisa moth
 Selenisa vittata (Maassen 1890)

References

 Natural History Museum Lepidoptera genus database
 
 

Omopterini
Moth genera